Veliki Podlog is a village in the Municipality of Krško in eastern Slovenia. The area is part of the traditional region of Lower Carniola. It is now included with the rest of the municipality in the Lower Sava Statistical Region.

The local church is dedicated to Saint Nicholas and belongs to the Parish of Leskovec pri Krškem. It dates to the 15th century with some 19th-century Neo-Gothic remodelling.

The western part of the Roman necropolis of Neviodunum has been excavated close to the settlement.

References

External links
Veliki Podlog on Geopedia

Populated places in the Municipality of Krško